My Skin Is Cold is the third EP by Norwegian black metal band Satyricon. It contains one new song, two re-mastered, and two live songs with an orchestra playing with the band.

Track listing
"My Skin Is Cold" - 05:06
"Live Through Me (Re-mastered)" - 05:12 (bonus track from Volcano)
"Existential Fear-Questions (Re-mastered)" - 06:02 (bonus track from Volcano)
"Repined Bastard Nation (Live w/orchestra)" - 05:48 (from Volcano)
"Mother North (Live w/orchestra) - 09:06 (from Nemesis Divina)

Credits

Satyricon
 Satyr (Sigurd Wongraven) – vocals, guitars, keyboards, bass (on "Live Through Me" & "Existential Fear-Questions")
 Frost (Kjetil-Vidar Haraldstad) – drums

Live band
 Steinar Gundersen (also known as "Azarak") – lead guitars
 A. O. Grønbech (Obsidian Claw) – rhythm guitars
 Lars K. Norberg – bass
 Jonna Nikula – keyboards

Session
 Victor Brandt – bass (on "My Skin is Cold")
 Snorre Ruch – additional guitars (on "My Skin is Cold")
 Knut "Euroboy" Schreiner – guitar solo (on "Existential Fear-Questions")

Production
 Engineered by Lars Klokkerhaug at Sonic Society, April 2008
 Mixed by Lars Klokkerhaug and Satyr at Sonic Society, April 2008

Trivia
 The original versions of the "re-mastered" tracks were only released as bonus tracks on the LP edition of Volcano.
 Both live tracks with orchestra are from the "Gjallarhorn Show at Sentrum Scene, Oslo, November 2006".
 The music and lyrics on "My Skin Is Cold" are based on a dream Satyr had during his visit to Tokyo in October 2007.

Satyricon (band) albums
2008 EPs
Roadrunner Records EPs